The following is a comprehensive discography of 808 State, an English electronic music group.

Albums

Studio albums

EPs, compilations, remixes, and video compilations

Singles

References

External Links 

 Official Site
 Official Discography

Electronic music group discographies
House music discographies
Discographies of British artists